The Surettahorn (also known as Pizzo Suretta) is a mountain in the Oberhalbstein Range of the Alps located on the border between Italy and Switzerland. It overlooks the Splügen Pass on its west side.

The Surettahorn has two summits: Punta Nera and Punta Rossa.

References

External links
 Surettahorn on Hikr
 Surettahorn on Summitpost

Mountains of the Alps
Alpine three-thousanders
Mountains of Switzerland
Mountains of Italy
Italy–Switzerland border
International mountains of Europe
Mountains of Graubünden
Sufers
Rheinwald